Gary V. Janetti (born March 22, 1966) is an American television writer, producer, and actor.

He has written for Family Guy, and was an executive producer on Will and Grace. He co-created and wrote the British sitcom Vicious, which aired on ITV from 2013 to 2016.

Janetti's Instagram page has gained international media attention primarily for a satirical characterization of Prince George and the child's imagined, and often catty, response to various photos and news stories about members of the British royal family. The page has more than 950,000 followers. Janetti produced a satire-animated sitcom version of Prince George called The Prince for HBO Max. He also provides the voice of Prince George.

Janetti's first solo nonfiction book, Do You Mind If I Cancel? (Things That Still Annoy Me), was published in October 2019, and became a New York Times Best Seller. His second is Start Without Me (I'll Be There in a Minute).

Personal life
Janetti divides his time between Los Angeles and New York City. He is married to his longtime partner, fashion stylist and television personality Brad Goreski.

Filmography

Producer

Writer

Actor

References

External links
 

20th-century American male writers
20th-century American screenwriters
21st-century American male writers
21st-century American screenwriters
American male television writers
American television writers
American gay writers
Living people
Place of birth missing (living people)
1966 births
American writers of Italian descent